Sebastian Bradatsch (born 8 May 1996) is a German ski jumper who has been competing since 2011.

Career
International debut of Sebastian Bradatsch took place on February 26, 2011 in German town of Baiersbronn. After that he featured several competitions including Alpencup
In 2012 Bradatsch succeed in scoring two actual jumping hills records: in Schonach (106,5 meter) and Oberstdorf (also 106,5 meter).
Year 2013 was quite successful for him as well. Participation in 2013 European Youth Olympic Winter Festival in Romanian Râșno brought Sebastian Bradatsch gold medal in Mixed-Team and silver in Team competition.
In the end of 2013 he participated as a part of German national team (in Qualification) in jumping during new year season with no access to world championships. At Junior World Championships 2014 in Val di Fiemme he passed a bit to get a medal and was ranked as fourth. At same championship he reached 5th place in Team competition with Paul Winter, Michael Herrmann und Dominik Mayländer.
Four Hills Tournament 2014/15 was featured by Sebastian Bradatsch as a part of German team in Oberstdorf and Garmisch-Partenkirchen.
Management: 24passion GbR

References

External links
 Sebastian Bradatsch in FIS database
 Viessmann about participatrion of Bradatsch in Almaty (in German)

1996 births
German male ski jumpers
Living people
Sportspeople from Magdeburg